The Universe's Star is a South Korean television drama starring  Suho (EXO) and Ji Woo. The drama is one of the "Three Color Fantasy" drama trilogy by MBC and Naver. The drama's color is White and it will be followed by Romance Full of Life (Green). It is airing on Naver TV Cast every weekday at 23:59 (KST) starting from January 23 and on MBC every Thursday at 23:10 (KST) starting from January 26, 2017.

Plot 
The Universe's Star is a love story between a gifted singer-songwriter Woo-joo (Kim Jun-myeon) and Byul (Ji Woo), a 19-year-old student who becomes the Grim Reaper after dying in an accident.

Cast

Main 
 Kim Jun-myeon as Woo-joo
 Ji Woo as Byul

Supporting 
 Shin Hyun-soo as Koo Se-joo
 Na Hae-ryung as Dr. Yoon So-ri
 Yoon Jin-sol as Gak-shi
 Go Gyu-pil as Manager Ko, Woo-joo's manager
 Lee Si-eon as grim reaper
 Lee Ji-hoon as Uhm Dae-pyong

Special appearance 
 Joo Jin-mo as Manager Ko
 Lee Dae-yeon as Woo-joo's father
 Lady Jane as Jo Yi-na

Production 
The drama is pre-produced as a co-production between Naver and iMBC.

The drama is written and directed by Kim Ji-hyun who's known for Splash Splash Love which won an award at the 20th AsiaTV Awards as the best short drama.

First script reading took place in September, 2016 at MBC Broadcasting Station in Sangam, South Korea.

Original soundtrack

Ratings 
 In the table below, the blue numbers represent the lowest ratings and the red numbers represent the highest ratings.
 NR denotes that the drama did not rank in the top 20 daily programs on that date.

References

External links 
 

2017 South Korean television series debuts
MBC TV television dramas
South Korean romantic fantasy television series
Korean-language television shows
Naver TV original programming
2017 South Korean television series endings